The Yukaghir languages (also Yukagir, Jukagir) are a small family of two closely related languages—Tundra and Kolyma Yukaghir—spoken by the Yukaghir in the Russian Far East living in the basin of the Kolyma River. At the 2002 Russian census, both Yukaghir languages taken together had 604 speakers. More recent reports from the field reveal that this number is far too high: Southern Yukaghir had maximum 60 fluent speakers in 2009, while the Tundra Yukaghir language had around 60–70. The entire family is thus to be regarded as moribund. The Yukaghir have experienced a politically imposed language shift in recent times, and a majority also speak Russian and Yakut.

In the Russian 2020-2021 census, 516 people reported speaking a Yukaghir language as their native language.

Classification and grammatical features
The relationship of the Yukaghir languages with other language families is uncertain, though it has been suggested that they are distantly related to the Uralic languages, thus forming the putative Uralic–Yukaghir language family.

Michael Fortescue argued that Yukaghir is related to the Eskimo-Aleut languages along with Uralic languages, forming the Uralo-Siberian language family. 

Tundra and Kolyma Yukaghir are the only two remnants of what used to be one of the dominant languages/language families of northeastern Siberia, spreading from the River Anadyr in the east to the River Lena in the west. On the basis of the evidence of early sources, it can be assumed that there existed a Yukaghir dialect continuum, with what is today Tundra Yukaghir and Kolyma Yukaghir at the extremes.

These two languages share only a relatively small part of the vocabulary and are not mutually intelligible. The basic grammatical structures, however, are very similar. Both languages have residual vowel harmony and a complex phonotactics of consonants. Both have rich agglutinative morphology and are strictly head-final. There is practically no finite subordination and very few coordinate structures. The most spectacular feature of TY and KY grammar is the split intransitive alignment system based on discourse-pragmatic features. In absence of narrow focus, the system is organised on the nominative–accusative basis; when focused, direct objects and subjects of intransitive verbs are co-aligned (special focus case, special focus agreement).

Members
The two extant varieties of Yukaghir are:
Tundra Yukaghir (Northern Yukaghir, also known as Wadul): 30 to 150 speakers in 1989. Last spoken in the tundra belt extending between the lower Indigirka to the lower Kolyma basin. Formerly spoken in a much wider area extending to the Lena basin in the west.
Kolyma Yukaghir (Forest Yukaghir, Southern Yukaghir, also known as Odul): 5 to 10 speakers in 2009. Last spoken in the forest zone near the sources of the Kolyma, divided between the Sakha Republic and the Magadan Oblast (around ), previously in the wider area of the upper Kolyma region.

Extinct varieties include Omok and Chuvan, which survived until perhaps the 18th century.

Lexical differences
Some lexical differences between Kolyma Yukaghir and Tundra Yukaghir:

{| class="wikitable sortable"
! gloss !! Kolyma Yukaghir !! Tundra Yukaghir
|-
! one
| irkēj || mōrqōñ
|-
! two
| ataqlōj || kijōñ
|-
! five
| iñhañbōj || imd’ald’añ
|-
! many
| niŋel || pojōl
|-
! all
| t’umu || jawnə
|-
! day
| pod’erqə || t’ajləŋ
|-
! sun
| jelōd’ə || jerpəjəŋ
|-
! water
| ōd’ī || lawjəŋ
|-
! fish
| anil || al’həŋ
|-
! reindeer
| at’ə || il’eŋ
|-
! dog
| pubel || laməŋ
|-
! person
| šoromə || ködeŋ
|-
! people
| omnī || t’īŋ
|-
! eye
| aŋd’ə || jȫd’īŋ
|-
! tooth
| todī || sal’hərīŋ
|-
! night
| emil || t’iŋit’əl
|-
! foot
| nojl || t’ohul
|-
! name
| ñū || kirijəŋ
|-
! to sit
| modo- || sahañeto
|-
! kill
| kuledə- || puñīto
|-
! die
| amdə- || jabəto
|-
! know
| leidī- || kurilīto
|-
! drink
| ožə- || law-
|}

Text sample (Northern Yukaghir)
Article 1 of the Universal Declaration of Human Rights:

Cyrillic:
Көдэҥ тэн – ньидитэ бандьэ параwааньэрэҥ тудэ чуҥдэн ньилдьилэк эннулҥинь-мэдьуолнуни. Көдэҥ энмун чундэ мэ льэй, таатльэр лукундьии ньинэмдьийилпэ дитэ эннуйуол-мораwньэҥи.

Latin:
Ködeng ten – n'idite band'e parawaan'ereng tude chungden n'ild'ilek ennulngin'-med'uolnuni. Ködeng enmun chunde me l'ey, taatl'er lukund'ii n'inemd'iyilpe dite ennuyuol-morawn'engi.

English translation:
All human beings are born free and equal in dignity and rights. They are endowed with reason and conscience and should act towards one another in a spirit of brotherhood.

See also

 Paleosiberian languages
 Indigenous peoples of Siberia
 Uralic languages
 Uralic–Yukaghir languages
 Yukaghirs

References

Further reading

Luobbal Sámmol Sámmol Ánte (Ante Aikio):  The Uralic-Yukaghir lexical correspondences: genetic inheritance, language contact or chance resemblance? – Finnisch-Ugrische Forschungen 62, pp. 7–76. Online article
Häkkinen, Jaakko: Early contacts between Uralic and Yukaghir. Suomalais-Ugrilaisen Seuran Toimituksia − Mémoires de la Société Finno-Ougrienne  264, pp. 91–101. Helsinki: Suomalais-ugrilainen seura, 2012. Online article (pdf)
 Jochel'son Vladimir I. 1900. Materialy po izucheniju jukagirskogo jazyka i fol’klora. ('Materials for the Study of Yukaghir Language and Folklore'). Sankt-Peterburg: Akademija nauk.
 Jochelson, Waldemar. 1926. The Yukaghir and the Yukaghirized Tungus. Memoirs of the American Museum of Natural History, 9, 13. Publications of the Jesup North Pacific Expedition. Leiden: Brill.
 Krejnovich, Erukhim A. 1958. Jukagirskij jazyk. ('The Yukaghir Language') Moscow and Leningrad: Nauka.
 Krejnovich, Erukhim A. 1982. Issledovanija i materialy po jukagirskomu jazyku. ('Investigations and Materials on the Yukaghir Language') Leningrad: Nauka.
 Kurilov, Gavril N. 2001. Jukagirsko-russkij slovar'. ('Yukaghir-Russian Dictionary') Novosibirsk: Nauka.
 Maslova, Elena. 2001. Yukaghir Texts. Wiesbaden: Harrassowitz.
 Maslova, Elena. 2003. A Grammar of Kolyma Yukaghir. Berlin/New York: Mouton de Gruyter.
 Maslova, Elena. 2003. Tundra Yukaghir. LINCOM Europa. Languages of the World/Materials 372.
 Nikolaeva, Irina. 2006. A Historical Dictionary of Yukaghir. Berlin/New York: Mouton de Gruyter.
 Vakhtin, Nikolaj B. 1991. The Yukagir language in sociolinguistic perspective. Steszew, Poland: International Institute of Ethnolinguistic and Oriental Studies.
 Willerslev, Rane 2007. Soul Hunters: Hunting, Animism, and Personhood among the Siberian Yukaghirs. Berkeley: University of California Press.
 Willerslev, Rane 2012. On the Run in Siberia. Minneapolis: University of Minnesota Press.

External links

 The Yukaghir Languages
 Online Documentation of Kolyma Yukaghir
 Project on Documentation of Tundra Yukaghir
 Tundra Yukaghir text sample – Declaration of Human Rights
 Wikimedia in Tundra Yukaghir
 Siberian languages
 Yukaghir stories

 
Agglutinative languages
Paleosiberian languages
Language families
Languages of Russia